Gymnetis thula, the harlequin flower beetle, is a species of scarab beetle in the family Scarabaeidae.

References

Cetoniinae
Articles created by Qbugbot
Beetles described in 2018